Francis Phelan is a former football (soccer) player who represented New Zealand at international level.

Phelan made his full All Whites debut as a substitute in a 5–1 win over Australia on 16 October 1980 and made a total of five A-international appearances, all as a substitute, his final cap an appearance in a 0–2 loss to Malaysia on 30 October 1980.

References 

Year of birth missing (living people)
Living people
New Zealand association footballers
New Zealand international footballers
Association football midfielders